Wah Wah Win Shwe (also spelt War War Win Shwe) is a three-time Myanmar Academy Award winning Burmese film actress. She is considered one of the most commercially successful actresses in the Myanmar entertainment industry.

Early life and education
She was born on 30 December 1943 to Tun Shwe and Than Tin in Rangoon, Burma, the youngest of four children. She attended Methodist English High School and enrolled at Rangoon University for higher education.

Film career
She began her career in film at the age of 16, with her debut film, Seit (lit. "Mind"). Throughout the course of her career, she has starred in hundreds of films and directed over 50. She won three Myanmar Motion Picture Academy Awards, for her work in Chit Thami (Lovely Daughter) in 1965, Chaung Ko Pyit Ywe Myit Ko Sha in 1969, and Meingalay Shin Ei Sanda in 1977.

Business interests
She founded the Wah Wah Win Shwe Film Production company in 1970. She also has interests in real estate, particularly in Yangon. She owns Su Htoo Pan Cinema. In 2012, she began work with Great Father Land Construction to redevelop the site of the historic cinema into a 14-storey condominium. In 2013, contractual disputes surfaced between the two parties, with Wah Wah Win Shwe claiming that the company had performed occult rituals on the site. The company accused her of retreating from an agreement to pay 1.2 billion kyat to build the tower and subsequently filed a defamation lawsuit in late June. In July of that year, Father Land Construction withdrew the lawsuit and cited her inability to pay for the remaining costs of construction.

Personal life
Wah Wah Win Shwe wed Than Htut, an actor, in 1971. They have two sons, Win Htut Win and Wa Zin. She is reported to have been romantically linked to Kokang ‘War lady’ Olive Yang.

Notes

References

Burmese film actresses
People from Yangon
20th-century Burmese actresses
Living people
University of Yangon alumni
1943 births